Philip Norman Hocking (27 October 1925 – 17 August 2008) was a British Conservative Party politician in the United Kingdom.  He was Member of Parliament (MP) for Coventry South from 1959 to 1964.

During his tenure in the House of Commons he was Parliamentary Private Secretary (PPS) to the Foreign Office. Hocking's victory in Coventry was certainly an achievement as the constituency was seen as a fairly strong Labour Party area and indeed he remains to this day the only Conservative to have won the seat. He became a close friend of Denys Bullard, another Conservative MP with agricultural interests whose seat depended on a small and hard-won majority in a difficult constituency. Hocking's most memorable contribution to the politics of the day was when he appeared on BBC Television following the Profumo affair. Hocking was asked if Harold Macmillan was finished politically; Hocking compared Macmillan to a pheasant once it has been shot. "It may have been shot," he said, "but it is still going to run and run." Having replaced Elaine Burton at the 1959 general election with the song "High Hopes" as his anthem, Hocking lost the 1964 election to William Wilson.

He lived in the Cotswolds throughout the rest of life, although latterly he had spent much time in America.

References

Times Guide to the House of Commons 1964

External links 
 

1925 births
2008 deaths
Conservative Party (UK) MPs for English constituencies
UK MPs 1959–1964